The Ludlow Massacre was a mass killing perpetrated by anti-striker militia during the Colorado Coalfield War. Soldiers from the Colorado National Guard and private guards employed by Colorado Fuel and Iron Company (CF&I) attacked a tent colony of roughly 1,200 striking coal miners and their families in Ludlow, Colorado, on April 20, 1914. Approximately 21 people, including miners' wives and children, were killed. John D. Rockefeller Jr., a part-owner of CF&I who had recently appeared before a United States congressional hearing on the strikes, was widely blamed for having orchestrated the massacre.

The massacre was the seminal event of the 1913–1914 Colorado Coalfield War, which began with a general United Mine Workers of America strike against poor labor conditions in CF&I's southern Colorado coal mines. The strike was organized by miners working for the Rocky Mountain Fuel Company and Victor-American Fuel Company. Ludlow was the deadliest single incident during the Colorado Coalfield War and spurred a ten-day period of heightened violence throughout Colorado. In retaliation for the massacre at Ludlow, bands of armed miners attacked dozens of anti-union establishments, destroying property and engaging in several skirmishes with the Colorado National Guard along a  front from Trinidad to Louisville. From the strike's beginning in September 1913 to intervention by federal soldiers under President Woodrow Wilson's orders on April 29, 1914, an estimated 69 to 199 people were killed during the strike. Historian Thomas G. Andrews has called it the "deadliest strike in the history of the United States."

The Ludlow Massacre was a watershed moment in American labor relations. Socialist historian Howard Zinn described it as "the culminating act of perhaps the most violent struggle between corporate power and laboring men in American history". Congress responded to public outrage by directing the House Committee on Mines and Mining to investigate the events. Its report, published in 1915, was influential in promoting child labor laws and an eight-hour work day. The massacre site is owned by the United Mine Workers of America, which erected a granite monument in memory of those who died that day. The Ludlow tent colony site was designated a National Historic Landmark on January 16, 2009, and dedicated on June 28, 2009. Subsequent investigations immediately following the massacre and modern archeological efforts largely support some of the strikers' accounts of the event.

Background

Areas of the Rocky Mountains have veins of coal close to the surface, providing significant and relatively accessible reserves. In 1867 these coal deposits caught the attention of William Jackson Palmer, then leading a survey team planning the route of the Kansas Pacific Railway. The rapid expansion of rail transport in the United States made coal a highly valued commodity, and it was rapidly commercialized.

At its peak in 1910, the coal mining industry of Colorado employed 15,864 people, 10% of jobs in the state. Colorado's coal industry was dominated by a handful of operators. Colorado Fuel and Iron was the largest coal operator in the west and one of the nation's most powerful corporations, at one point employing 7,050 people and controlling  of coal land. John D. Rockefeller purchased a controlling stake in the Colorado Fuel & Iron Company in 1902, and nine years later he turned over his controlling interest in the company to his son, John D. Rockefeller Jr., who managed the company from his offices at 26 Broadway in New York.

Mining was dangerous and difficult work. Colliers in Colorado were constantly threatened by explosions, suffocation, and collapsing mine walls. In 1912 the death rate in Colorado's mines was 7.055 per 1,000 employees, compared to a national rate of 3.15. In 1914 the United States House Committee on Mines and Mining reported:
 
Colorado has good mining laws and such that ought to afford protection to the miners as to safety in the mine if they were enforced, yet in this State the percentage of fatalities is larger than any other, showing there is undoubtedly something wrong in reference to the management of its coal mines.

Miners were generally paid according to tonnage of coal produced, while so-called "dead work", such as shoring up unstable roofs, was often unpaid. The tonnage system drove many poor and ambitious colliers to gamble with their lives by neglecting precautions and taking on risk, with consequences that were often fatal.Between 1884 and 1912 mining accidents claimed the lives of more than 1,700 in Colorado. In 1913 alone 110 men died in mine-related accidents.

Colliers had little opportunity to air their grievances. Many resided in company towns, in which all land, real estate, and amenities were owned by the mine operator, and which were expressly designed to inculcate loyalty and squelch dissent. Welfare capitalists believed that anger and unrest among the workers could be placated by raising colliers' standard of living, while subsuming it under company management. Company towns indeed brought tangible improvements to many colliers' lives, including larger houses, better medical care, and broader access to education. But owning the towns gave companies considerable control over all aspects of workers' lives, and they did not always use this power to augment public welfare. Historian Philip S. Foner has described company towns as "feudal domain[s], with the company acting as lord and master. ... The 'law' consisted of the company rules. Curfews were imposed. Company guards—brutal thugs armed with machine guns and rifles loaded with soft-point bullets—would not admit any 'suspicious' stranger into the camp and would not permit any miner to leave." Miners who came into conflict with the company were often summarily evicted from their homes.

Frustrated by working conditions they found unsafe and unjust, colliers increasingly turned to unions. Nationwide, organized mines boasted 40% fewer fatalities than nonunion mines. Colorado miners repeatedly attempted to unionize after the state's first strike in 1883. The Western Federation of Miners organized primarily hard-rock miners in the gold and silver camps during the 1890s.

Beginning in 1900, the United Mine Workers of America began organizing coal miners in the western states, including southern Colorado. The union decided to focus on the Colorado Fuel & Iron Company because of its harsh management tactics under the conservative and distant Rockefellers and other investors. To break or prevent strikes, the coal companies hired strike breakers, mainly from Mexico and southern and eastern Europe. The Colorado Fuel & Iron Company mixed immigrants of different nationalities in the mines to discourage communication that might lead to organization.

Strike

Despite attempts to suppress union activity, the United Mine Workers of America secretly continued its unionization efforts in the years leading up to 1913. Eventually, the union presented a list of seven demands:

 Recognition of the union as bargaining agent
 Compensation for digging coal at a ton rate based on 2,000 pounds (previous ton rates were of long tons of 2,200 pounds)
 Enforcement of the eight-hour work-day law
 Payment for "dead work" (laying track, timbering, handling impurities, etc.)
 Weight checkmen elected by the workers (to keep company weightmen honest)
 Right to use any store, and to choose their boarding houses and doctors
 Strict enforcement of Colorado's laws (such as mine safety rules, abolition of scrip), and an end to the company guard system

The major coal companies rejected the demands. In September 1913 the United Mine Workers of America called a strike. Those who went on strike were evicted from their company homes and moved to tent villages prepared by the union. The tents were built on wood platforms and furnished with cast-iron stoves on land the union had leased in preparation for a strike.

When leasing the sites, the union had selected locations near the mouths of canyons that led to the coal camps in order to block any strikebreakers' traffic. The company hired the Baldwin–Felts Detective Agency to protect the new workers and harass the strikers.

Baldwin–Felts had a reputation for aggressive strike breaking. Agents shone searchlights on the tent villages at night and fired bullets into the tents at random, occasionally killing and maiming people. They used an improvised armored car, mounted with a machine gun the union called the "Death Special", to patrol the camp's perimeters. The steel-covered car was built at the Colorado Fuel & Iron Company plant in Pueblo, Colorado, from the chassis of a large touring sedan. Confrontations between striking miners and working miners, whom the union called scabs, sometimes resulted in deaths. Frequent sniper attacks on the tent colonies drove the miners to dig pits beneath the tents to hide in. Armed battles also occurred between (mostly Greek) strikers and sheriffs recently deputized to suppress the strike: this was the Colorado Coalfield War.

As strike-related violence mounted, Colorado governor Elias M. Ammons called in the Colorado National Guard on October 28. At first, the Guard's appearance calmed the situation, but the Guard leaders' sympathies lay with company management. Guard Adjutant-General John Chase, who had served during the violent Cripple Creek strike 10 years earlier, imposed a harsh regime. On March 10, 1914, a replacement worker's body was found on the railroad tracks near Forbes, Colorado. The National Guard said the strikers had murdered the man. In retaliation, Chase ordered the Forbes tent colony destroyed. The attack was launched while the residents were attending a funeral of two infants who had died a few days earlier. Photographer Lou Dold witnessed the attack, and his images of the destruction often appear in accounts of the strike.

The strikers persevered until the spring of 1914. By then, according to historian Anthony DeStefanis, the National Guard had largely broken the strike by helping the mine operators bring in non-union workers. The state had also run out of money to maintain the Guard, and Ammons decided to recall them. He and the mining companies, fearing a breakdown in order, left one company of Guardsmen in southern Colorado. They formed a new company called "Troop A", which consisted largely of Colorado Fuel & Iron Company mine camp guards and mine guards hired by Baldwin–Felts, who were given National Guard uniforms.

Massacre

On the morning of April 20, the day after some in the tent colony celebrated Orthodox Easter, three Guardsmen appeared at the camp ordering the release of a man they claimed was being held against his will. The camp leader, Louis Tikas, left to meet with Major Patrick J. Hamrock at the train station in Ludlow village,  from the colony. While this meeting was progressing, two militias installed a machine gun on a ridge near the camp and took positions along a rail route about half a mile south of Ludlow. Simultaneously, armed Greek miners began flanking to an arroyo. When two of the militias' dynamite explosions–detonated to draw support from the National Guard units at Berwind and Cedar Hill–alerted the Ludlow tent colony, the miners took up positions at the bottom of the hill. When the militia opened fire, hundreds of miners and their families ran for cover.

The fighting raged for the entire day. The militia was reinforced by non-uniformed mine guards later in the afternoon. At dusk a passing freight train stopped on the tracks in front of the Guards' machine-gun placements, allowing many of the miners and their families to escape to an outcrop of hills to the east called the Black Hills. By 7 p.m., the camp was in flames, and the militia descended on it and began to search and loot it. Tikas had remained in the camp the entire day and was still there when the fire started. He and two other men were captured by the militia. Tikas and Lt. Karl Linderfelt, commander of one of two Guard companies, had confronted each other several times in the previous months. While two militiamen held Tikas, Linderfelt broke a rifle butt over his head. Tikas and the other two captured miners were later found shot dead. Tikas had been shot in the back. Their bodies lay along the Colorado and Southern Railway tracks for three days in full view of passing trains. The militia officers refused to allow them to be moved until a local of a railway union demanded they be taken away for burial.

During the battle, four women and 11 children hid in a pit beneath one tent, where they were trapped when the tent above them was set on fire. Two of the women and all the children suffocated. These deaths became a rallying cry for the United Mine Workers of America, who called the incident the Ludlow Massacre.

Julia May Courtney reported different numbers in her contemporaneous article "Remember Ludlow!" for the magazine Mother Earth. She said that, in addition to men who were killed, a total of 55 women and children had died in the massacre. According to her account, the militia:

Some reports say a second machine gun was brought in to support the estimated 200 Guardsmen who participated in the engagement, and that a Colorado and Southern train's operators purposely put their engine between a machine gun and the strikers as a shield against National Guard fire.

A board of Colorado military officers described the events as beginning with the killing of Tikas and other strikers in custody, with gunfire largely emanating from the southwestern corner of the Ludlow Colony. Guardsmen stationed on "Water Tank Hill"—the name for the machine gun position—fired into the camp. The Guardsmen reported having seen women and children withdrawing the morning before the battle and said they thought the strikers would not have begun firing if they had women still with them. The board's official report commended the "truly heroic behavior" of Linderfelt, the guardsmen, and the militia during the battle and blamed the strikers for any civilian casualties during the engagement, despite those killed being family members of the strikers. The report also blamed the looting that occurred afterward on "Troop 'A'", a unit composed largely of non-uniformed mine guards who had been integrated into the Guard.

In addition to the miners and their family members, three regular members of the National Guard and one other militiaman were reported killed in the day's fighting by contemporary accounts. However, modern historians assert that only one of the militia's number, a private named Martin of the National Guard, was killed. Martin was fatally shot in the neck, presumably by strikers.

Aftermath
In the aftermath of the massacre came the Ten Day War, part of the wider Colorado Coalfield War. As news of the deaths of women and children spread, the leaders of organized labor issued a call to arms. They urged union members to get "all the arms and ammunition legally available". Subsequently, the coal miners began a large-scale guerrilla war against the mine guards and facilities throughout Colorado's southern coalfields. In the town of Trinidad, the United Mine Workers of America openly and officially distributed arms and ammunition to strikers at union headquarters. Over the next ten days, 700 to 1,000 strikers "attacked mine after mine, driving off or killing the guards and setting fire to the buildings." At least 50 people, including those at Ludlow, were killed during the ten days of fighting between the guards and miners. Hundreds of state militia reinforcements were rushed to the coalfields to regain control of the situation. The fighting ended only after President Woodrow Wilson sent in federal troops. The troops disarmed both sides, displacing and often arresting the militia in the process. The Colorado Coalfield War produced a total death toll of approximately 75.

The United Mine Workers of America finally ran out of money, and called off the strike on December 10, 1914. In the end, the strikers' demands were not met, the union did not obtain recognition, and many striking workers were replaced. 408 strikers were arrested, 332 of whom were indicted for murder.

Of those present at Ludlow during the massacre, only John R. Lawson, leader of the strike, was convicted of murder, and the Colorado Supreme Court eventually overturned the conviction. Twenty-two National Guardsmen, including 10 officers, were court-martialed. While Linderfelt was found responsible for the deaths of Tikas and other strikers that exhibited execution-style injuries, he and all others were acquitted.

An Episcopalian minister, Reverend John O. Ferris, pastored Trinity Church in Trinidad and another church in Aguilar. He was one of the few pastors in Trinidad permitted to search and provide Christian burials to the deceased victims of the Ludlow Massacre.

Victims

Legacy

The massacre sparked nationwide reproach for the Rockefellers, especially in New York, where protesters demonstrated outside of the Rockefeller building in New York City. Protesters led by Ferrer Center anarchists Alexander Berkman and Carlo Tresca followed when Rockefeller Jr. fled  upstate to the family estate near Tarrytown. In early July, a failed bomb plot on the Tarrytown estate ended with a dynamite explosion in East Harlem and three dead anarchists. The New York City Police Department inaugurated its bomb squad within a month. Bomb plots continued throughout the rest of the year.

Although the UMWA failed to win recognition from the company, the strike had a lasting effect both on conditions at the Colorado mines and on labor relations nationally. John D. Rockefeller Jr. engaged W. L. Mackenzie King, a labor relations expert and future Canadian Prime Minister, to help him develop reforms for the mines and towns. Improvements included paved roads and recreational facilities, as well as worker representation on committees dealing with working conditions, safety, health, and recreation. He prohibited discrimination against workers who had belonged to unions and ordered the establishment of a company union. The miners voted to accept the Rockefeller plan.

Rockefeller Jr. also brought in pioneer public relations expert Ivy Lee, who warned that the Rockefellers were losing public support and developed a strategy that Rockefeller followed to repair it. Rockefeller had to overcome his shyness, go to Colorado to meet the miners and their families, inspect the homes and the factories, attend social events, and listen closely to the grievances. This was novel advice, and attracted widespread media attention. The Rockefellers were able both to resolve the conflict, and present a more humanized versions of their leaders.

Over time, Ludlow has assumed "a striking centrality in the interpretation of the nation's history developed by several of the most important left-leaning thinkers of the 20th century." Historian Howard Zinn, noted for his controversial reframing of U.S. history, wrote his master's thesis and several book chapters on Ludlow. George McGovern wrote his doctoral dissertation on the subject. In 1972, the same year as his U.S. presidential campaign, he published this dissertation with the help of historian Leonard Guttridge under the title The Great Coalfield War.

A United States Commission on Industrial Relations (CIR), headed by labor lawyer Frank Walsh, conducted hearings in Washington, DC, collecting information and taking testimony from all the principals, including Rockefeller Sr., who testified that, even after knowing that guards in his pay had committed atrocities against the strikers, he "would have taken no action" to prevent his hirelings from attacking them. The commission's report endorsed many of the reforms the unions sought, and provided support for bills establishing a national eight-hour workday and a ban on child labor.

The last survivor of the Ludlow Massacre, Ermenia "Marie" Padilla Daley, was 3 months old during the event. Her father was a miner and she was born in the camp. Her mother took her and her siblings away as violence escalated; they traveled by train to Trinidad, Colorado. The evacuation resulted in the family having to split up afterward. Daley was cared for by various families and also placed for a time in orphanages in Pueblo and Denver. She worked as a housekeeper, then married a consultant whose work allowed them to travel the world. Daley died on March 14, 2019, at age 105.

Representation in other media
Several popular songs have been written and recorded about the events at Ludlow. Among them are American folk singer Woody Guthrie's "Ludlow Massacre", Red Dirt country singer Jason Boland's "Ludlow", and Irish musician Andy Irvine's "The Monument (Lest We Forget)".

Upton Sinclair's novel King Coal is loosely based on the origin and aftermath of the Ludlow Massacre. Thomas Pynchon's 2006 novel Against the Day contains a chapter on the massacre.

American writer and Colorado Poet Laureate David Mason wrote what he calls a verse-novel, Ludlow (2007), inspired by the labor dispute. Composer Lori Laitman's opera Ludlow is based on Mason's book. The University of Colorado's New Opera Works presented Act I of the opera in June 2012, directed by Beth Greenberg.

Commemorations

Memorial
In 1916, the United Mine Workers of America bought the site of the Ludlow tent colony. Two years later, they erected the Ludlow Monument to commemorate those who died during the strike. It was fabricated by the Jones Brothers Company of Barre, Vermont using local granite was commissioned by Sam Falsetto, president of the United Mine Workers of Trinidad, Colorado. The Springfield Granite Company served as the contractor. The monument was damaged in May 2003 by unknown vandals. The repaired monument was unveiled on June 5, 2005, with slightly altered faces on the statues.

National Historic Landmark
The tent colony site was listed on the National Register of Historic Places in 1985, was designated a U.S. National Historic Landmark in 2009.  Although the area continued to be occupied by mine workers and their families after the events of May 1914, they relocated, leaving the original encampment site relatively undisturbed.  The site is consequently one of the best-preserved archaeological remains of such an encampment, and the monument is one of the earliest to commemorate a labor action of this type.  The site is the first of its kind to be investigated by archeologists.

On May 7, 2003, vandals attacked the monument cutting off the sold granite/marble head of the male figure and the arm of the female figure. The missing parts were never recovered but replaced in 2005 with funding from private donations.

Centennial
On April 19, 2013, Colorado Governor John Hickenlooper signed an executive order to create the Ludlow Centennial Commemoration Commission. The group worked to develop programming in the state, such as lectures and exhibits, to commemorate the Ludlow workers' struggle and raise awareness of the massacre. It worked with Colorado museums, historical societies, churches and art galleries, and supplied programming in 2014.

Historical investigation

Archaeology
In 1996, the 1913–1914 Colorado Coalfield War Project began under the leadership of Randall H. McGuire of Binghamton University, Dean Saitta of University of Denver, and Philip Duke of Fort Lewis College, who later formed the Ludlow Collective. Their team conducted excavations of the territory of the former tent colony and surrounding areas.

Gallery

See also

 Coal Wars
 Colorado Labor Wars
 Columbine Mine Massacre of 1927
 Labor history of the United States
 Labor movement
 Labor unions
 Labor unions in the United States
 List of battles fought in Colorado
 List of incidents of civil unrest in the United States
 List of massacres in the United States
 List of worker deaths in United States labor disputes
 Ludlow Massacre (song)
 Mary Thomas O'Neal
 Union violence

References

Further reading

 Adams, G., The Age of Industrial Violence, 1910–1915: The Activities and Findings of the U.S. Commission on Industrial Relations. Columbia University Press, New York, 1966.
 Alhadef, Tammy. "Last Survivor of Ludlow Massacre Dies at 94." Pueblo Chieftain. July 6, 2007.
 Beshoar, Barron B., Out of the Depths: The Story of John R. Lawson, a Labor Leader.  Colorado Historical Commission and Denver Trades and Labor Assembly, Denver, 1957.
 Boughton, Major Edward J., Capt. William C. Danks, and Capt. Philip S. Van Cise, Ludlow:  Being the Report of the Special Board of Officers Appointed by the Governor of Colorado to Investigate and Determine the Facts with Reference to the Armed Conflict Between the Colorado National Guard and Certain Persons Engaged in the Coal Mining Strike at Ludlow, Colo., April 20, 1914.
 Chernow, R., Titan: The Life of John D. Rockefeller Sr., Random House, New York, 1998.
 Clyne, R., Coal People: Life in Southern Colorado's Company Towns, 1890–1930.  Colorado Historical Society, Denver, 1999.
 Coal—The Kingdom Below, Trinidad Printing, Trinidad, Colorado, 1992
 Cronin, W., G. Miles, and J. Gitlin, Becoming West: Toward a New Meaning for Western History, Under an Open Sky: Rethinking America's Western Past, edited by W. Cronin,  G. Miles, and J. Gitlin, W.W. Norton and Company, New York, 1992.
 DeStefanis, Anthony, "Violence and the Colorado National Guard: Masculinity, Race, Class, and Identity in the 1913–1914 Southern Colorado Coal Strike" in Mining Women: Gender in the Development of a Global Industry, 1670 to the Present, Laurie Mercier and Jaclyn Gier, eds. (New York: Palgrave Macmillan, 2010), 195–212
 DeStefanis, Anthony, "The Road to Ludlow: Breaking the 1913–14 Southern Colorado Coal Strike," Journal of the Historical Society, 12 no. 2 (September 2012): 341–390.* 
 Downing, Sybil, Fire in the Hole.  University Press of Colorado, Niwot, Colorado, 1996.
 Farrar, Frederick,  Papers of the Colorado Attorney General, Western History/Genealogy Department, Denver Public Library, including Testimony by Capt. Philip S. Van Cise in the Transcript of the Court of Inquiry Ordered by Gov. Carlson in 1915.
 
 Foote, K.,  Shadowed Ground: America's Landscapes of Violence and Tragedy.  University of Texas Press, Austin, 1997.
 Fox, M., United We Stand: The United Mine Workers of America, 1890–1990.  International Union, United Mine Workers of America, Washington, 1990.
 Gitelman, H., Legacy of the Ludlow Massacre: A Chapter in American Industrial Relations.  University of Pennsylvania Press, Philadelphia, 1988.
 Long, Priscilla. Where the Sun Never Shines: A History of America's Bloody Coal Industry. Paragon House, New York, 1989.
 Mahan, Bill, "The Ludlow Massacre: An Audio History. Water Tank Hill Productions, 1994.
 Margolis, Eric, Western Coal Mining as a Way of Life: An Oral History of the Colorado Coal Miners to 1914.  Journal of the West 24(3), 1985.
 
 McGuire, R. and P. Reckner, The Unromantic West: Labor, Capital, and Struggle.  Paper presented at the annual meeting of the Society for Historical Archaeology, Salt Lake City, 1998.
 Memorial Day at Ludlow, United Mine Workers Journal, June 6, 1918.
 Nankivell, Major John H., History of the Military Organizations of the State of Colorado 1860–1935, Infantry U.S. Army (Senior Instructor, Colorado National Guard), obtained from the Colorado Historical Society, 1935.
 
  Norwood, Stephen H.; Strikebreaking & Intimidation: Mercenaries and Masculinity in Twentieth-Century America. University of North Carolina Press. 2002.
 Papanikolas, Zeese, Buried Unsung: Louis Tikas and the Ludlow Massacre. University of Utah Press, Salt Lake City, 1982.
 Roth, L., Company Towns in the Western United States, The Company Town: Architecture and Society in the Early Industrial Age, edited by John S. Garner.  Oxford University Press, New York, 1992.
 Saitta, D., R. McGuire, and P. Duke, Working and Striking in Southern Colorado, 1913–1914. Presented at the Society for Historical Archaeology annual meeting, Salt Lake City, 1999
 Saitta, D., M. Walker, and P. Reckner, Battlefields of Class Conflict: Ludlow then and now, Journal of Conflict Archaeology 1, 2005.
 Scamehorn, H. Lee, Mill & Mine: The CF&I in the Twentieth Century.  University of Nebraska Press, Lincoln, 1992.
 Seligman, E., Colorado's Civil War and Its Lessons.  Leslie's Illustrated Weekly Newspaper, November 5, 1914.
 Sinclair, Upton, King Coal.  The MacMillan Company, New York, 1917.
 Sunieseri, A., The Ludlow Massacre: A Study in the Mis-Employment of the National Guard.  Salvadore Books, Waterloo, Iowa, 1972.
 The Coal War.  Colorado Associated University Press, Boulder, 1976.
 The Crisis in Colorado.  The Annalist, May 4, 1914.
 Transcript of the Court Martial of Sgt. P.M. Cullen and Privates Mason and Pacheco, among others, Testimony of Lt. K.M. Linderfelt, Sgt. P. Cullen, and Ray W. Benedict, State of Colorado Archives.
 Transcript from the Court Martial of Capt. Edwin F. Carson, Testimony of Sgt. Cullen, State of Colorado Archives.
 The Denver Post:  May 12, 13, 14, 15, 16, 17, 18, 19, 20, 22, 24, 26, 28, and 30 and June 3, 1914
 The Trinidad Free Press:  April 24 and 29, 1914, and May 9, 1914
 United Mine Workers of America, An Answer to 'The Report of the Commanding General to the Governor for the Use of the Congressional Committee on the Military Occupation of the Coal Strike Zone by the Colorado National Guard during 1913–1914, State of Colorado Archives
 
 
 Vol VII
 Vol. VIII
 Vol. IX
 
 
 Vallejo, M. E., Recollections of the Colorado Coal Strike, 1913–1914, La Gente: Hispano History and Life in Colorado, edited by V. De Baca.  Colorado Historical Society, Denver, 1998.
 Walker, M., The Ludlow Massacre: Labor Struggle and Historical Memory in Southern Colorado.  Paper presented at the North American Labor History Conference, Detroit, Michigan, 1999.
 Yellen, S., American Labor Struggles.  Harcourt, Brace and Company, New York, 1936.
 
 Zinn, H., The Politics of History: With a New Introduction.  University of Illinois Press, 1990.
 Zinn, H., Dana Frank, and Robin D. G. Kelley, Three Strikes: The Fighting Spirit of Labor's Last Century

External links

 The Steelworks Center of the West and the Colorado Fuel & Iron Company Archives.
 
 The World Socialist Web Site A four-part series on the history of the massacre and its place in the history of the American working class.
 The Colorado Coal Field War Project An account of the strike and the assault by the Colorado State National Guard, published by University of Denver's Anthropology department.
 Phelps-Dodge Mine explosion, 1913. During the time of the Colorado Coalfields Strike (which included Ludlow) this mine in New Mexico exploded, killing 263 men, the second deadliest mine disaster in US history. It was owned by Rockefeller-in-law M. Hartley-Dodge, owner of Remington Arms.
 Ludlow Massacre – Historical Background Background material prepared by the Colorado Bar for the 2003 Colorado Mock Trial program
 The Ludlow Massacre on libcom.org/history
 The lyrics to Woodie Guthrie's "Ludlow Massacre" are here  and the lyrics to Guthrie's closely related song about copper miners in Calumet, Michigan, "1913 Massacre", are here. 
 The Virtual Oral/Aural History Archive Audio of an interview with Ludlow survivor Mary Thomas O'Neal in 1974.
 Historian Howard Zinn on the ludlow Massacre
 Caleb Crain, "There Was Blood: The Ludlow Massacre Revisited," The New Yorker January 19, 2009.
 Caleb Crain, "Notebook: The Ludlow Massacre Revisited," an annotated bibliography to the preceding article
 Interview with David Hawkins, nephew of Ludlow Massacre miners' lawyer, Horace Hawkins
 Hundredth Anniversary of the Ludlow Massacre , historian Jonathan Rees and author Jeff Biggers, The Real News, 2014.04.20
 The Ludlow Massacre Still Matters. The New Yorker, April 18, 2014.

1914 in Colorado
1914 labor disputes and strikes
1918 establishments in Colorado
1918 sculptures
April 1914 events
Archaeological sites in Colorado
Battles in Colorado
Ludlow
Coal Wars
Colorado Mining Boom
Colorado National Guard
Granite sculptures in Colorado
Greek-American history
Labor disputes in Colorado
Labor disputes led by the United Mine Workers of America
Labor monuments and memorials
Las Animas County, Colorado
Law enforcement operations in the United States
Mass murder in 1914
Mass murder in Colorado
Mass murder in the United States
Massacres in 1918
Massacres in the United States
Military history of Colorado
Mining in Colorado
Monuments and memorials in Colorado
National Historic Landmarks in Colorado
National Register of Historic Places in Colorado
Outdoor sculptures in Colorado
Political repression in the United States
Protest-related deaths
Riots and civil disorder in Colorado
Rockefeller family
United Mine Workers of America
Vandalized works of art in the United States
Anti-union violence